Coushatta is a town in, and the parish seat of, rural Red River Parish in north Louisiana, United States. It is situated on the east bank of the Red River. The community is approximately 45 miles south of Shreveport on U.S. Highway 71. The population, 2,299 at the 2000 census, is nearly two-thirds African American, most with long family histories in the area. The 2010 census, however, reported 1,964 residents, a decline of 335 persons, or nearly 15 percent during the course of the preceding decade. The city is named after the Coushatta, a Native American nation indigenous to the region.

History

Red River Parish and the Red River Valley were areas of unrest and white paramilitary activity and violence after the Civil War, and especially during the 1870s of Reconstruction. The parish developed around cotton cultivation and  enslaved African Americans who far outnumbered the whites. After the war, white planters and farmers tried to reestablish dominance over a majority of the population. With emancipation and being granted citizenship and suffrage, African Americans tried to create their own lives.

Formed in May 1874 from white militias, the White League in Louisiana was increasingly well-organized in rural areas like Red River Parish.  It worked to turn out the Democratic Party, as well as suppress freedmen's civil rights and voting rights. It used violence against officeholders, running some out of town and killing others, and acted near elections to suppress black and white Republican voter turnout.

In one of the more flagrant examples of violence, the White League in August 1874 captured six Republican officials in Coushatta, made them sign a pledge to leave the state, and escorted them when they were assassinated on their departure from the state. Victims included the brother and three brothers-in-law of the Republican State Senator Marshall H. Twitchell. Twitchell's wife and her brothers were from a family with long ties in Red River Parish. One of Twitchell's several biographies is an unpublished 1969 dissertation at Mississippi State University in Starkville by the historian Jimmy G. Shoalmire, a Shreveport native and a specialist in Reconstruction studies.

The White League also killed five to twenty freedmen who had been escorting the Republicans and were witnesses to the assassinations. The events became known as the Coushatta Massacre and contributed to the Republican governor's requesting more Federal troops from U.S. President U.S. Grant to help control the state.  Ordinary Southerners wrote to the White House describing the terrible conditions and fear they lived under during these years.

With increased fraud, violence and intimidation, white Redeemer Democrats gained control of the state legislature in 1876 and established a new system of one-party rule.  They passed laws making elections more complicated and a new constitution with provisions that effectively disenfranchised most African Americans and many poorer whites. This disenfranchisement persisted for decades into the 20th century before passage of civil rights legislation and the Voting Rights Act of 1965.

After World War II, Dr. Lawrence Edward L'Herisson, Sr. (1925–1988), a native of Bossier Parish, built a 23-bed regional rural hospital in Coushatta. He subsequently relocated to Shreveport with his wife, the former Mary Sloan (1925–2016). Coushatta is now served by the 25-bed Christus Coushatta Health Care Center.

Dr. L'Herisson's father-in-law, whom he never met, Lawrence Wiley Sloan (1892–1935,) died in an accident during the early attempt to bring electricity to southern  Tennessee. The Tennessee Valley Authority, launched in 1933, honored Sloan by designating his then nine-year-old daughter, Mary, to throw the switch that energized the region.

Geography

North of Coushatta, Loggy Bayou, which flows from Lake Bistineau, joins the Red River.

Climate
This climatic region is typified by relatively small seasonal temperature variations, with warm to hot (and often humid) summers and mild winters. According to the Köppen Climate Classification system, Coushatta has a humid subtropical climate, abbreviated "Cfa" on climate maps.

Demographics

2020 census

As of the 2020 United States census, there were 1,752 people, 856 households, and 541 families residing in the town.

2000 census
As of the census of 2000, there were 2,299 people, 738 households, and 512 families residing in the town. The racial makeup of the town was 33.19% White, 65.42% African American, 0.09% Native American, 0.13% Asian, 0.04% Pacific Islander, 0.39% from other races, and 0.74% from two or more races. Hispanic or Latino of any race were 1.17% of the population.

There were 738 households, out of which 38.5% had children under the age of 18 living with them, 34.4% were married couples living together, 31.8% had a female householder with no husband present, and 30.6% were non-families. 27.1% of all households were made up of individuals, and 12.9% had someone living alone who was 65 years of age or older. The average household size was 2.82 and the average family size was 3.48.

In the town, the population was spread out, with 33.3% under the age of 18, 10.6% from 18 to 24, 22.7% from 25 to 44, 17.8% from 45 to 64, and 15.5% who were 65 years of age or older. The median age was 30 years. For every 100 females, there were 78.6 males. For every 100 females age 18 and over, there were 73.7 males.

The median income for a household in the town was $15,500, and the median income for a family was $18,958. Males had a median income of $30,938 versus $13,833 for females. The per capita income for the town was $10,228. About 44.6% of families and 49.7% of the population were below the poverty line, including 64.0% of those under age 18 and 19.7% of those age 65 or over.

Economy

Coushatta is the home of C Troop 2-108th Cavalry Squadron, a unit dating back to the Confederate Army during the Civil War under the nickname "the Wildbunch." This unit was formerly known as A Company 1-156 Armor Battalion and served recently in Iraq during 2004–2005 under the 256th Infantry Brigade. This unit returned from its second deployment to Iraq in 2010.

Education

Coushatta and all of Red River Parish are served by the Red River Parish School District. Zoned campuses include Red River Elementary School (grades PK–5), Red River Junior High School (grades 6–8), and Red River Senior High School (grades 9–12).

Media 

Newspapers include The Coushatta Citizen and Red River Parish Journal.  Radio station KRRP broadcasts gospel music.

Notable people
 Joe Adcock, slugging first baseman for the Milwaukee Braves in the 1950s, was born and reared in Coushatta.
 Henry Bethard, member of the Louisiana House of Representatives from Red River Parish, 1960–1964; former Coushatta town attorney
 Edgar Cason (born 1952), businessman and philanthropist
 John Hilliard, Defensive end who played for the Seattle Seahawks
 Andrew R. Johnson (1856–1933), Louisiana state senator from 1916–1924 from Bienville and Claiborne parishes and mayor of Homer, Louisiana. He named the village of Ashland, Louisiana. He is interred at Springville Cemetery in Coushatta.
 Vickie Johnson, WNBA New York Liberty (1997–2006), San Antonio Silver Stars (2006–2009), head coach of the San Antonio Silver Stars (2017), assistant coach for the Las Vegas Aces (present)
 Donald G. Kelly graduated from the former Coushatta High School. A Natchitoches attorney and horseman, he served in the Louisiana State Senate from 1976 to 1996.
 Bennie Logan, NFL defensive lineman for the Tennessee Titans
 James M. McLemore, cattleman from Alexandria; candidate for governor in 1952 and 1956; born in Coushatta in 1907
 S. M. Morgan, Jr., member of the Louisiana House of Representatives from 1964 to 1968; the last House member to represent only Red River Parish
 Lester Vetter, mayor of Coushatta 1948 to 1952, state representative from 1952 until his death in 1960
 Lloyd F. Wheat, retired attorney and state senator from Red River and Natchitoches parishes from 1948 to 1952; formerly resided in Coushatta
 W. Scott Wilkinson, Coushatta native and a Shreveport attorney, state representative for Caddo Parish

In popular culture
Huell Babineaux, a fictional character from the American television shows Breaking Bad and Better Call Saul, is from Coushatta. Coushatta plays a pivotal role in the Better Call Saul episode of the same name.

References

External links
Town of Coushatta

Towns in Louisiana
Towns in Red River Parish, Louisiana
Parish seats in Louisiana